Pankinsky is a rural locality (a khutor) in Upornikovskoye Rural Settlement, Nekhayevsky District, Volgograd Oblast, Russia. The population was 155 as of 2010. There are 2 streets.

Geography 
Pankinsky is located between Akishevka River and 18K-6 Track, 23 km southeast of Nekhayevskaya (the district's administrative centre) by road. Upornikovskaya is the nearest rural locality.

References 

Rural localities in Nekhayevsky District